John Winning Murray (24 April 1865 – 16 September 1922) was a Scottish footballer who played in the Football League for Blackburn Rovers and Sunderland.

References

Sources

1865 births
1922 deaths
Scottish footballers
English Football League players
Sunderland A.F.C. players
Blackburn Rovers F.C. players
Scotland international footballers
Vale of Leven F.C. players
Association football fullbacks
Footballers from Stirling (council area)
Place of death missing